Robert Wright (11 November 1914 – 20 January 1965) was an Australian cricketer. He played in two first-class matches for South Australia in 1933/34.

See also
 List of South Australian representative cricketers

References

External links
 

1914 births
1965 deaths
Australian cricketers
South Australia cricketers
Cricketers from Adelaide